Pond's Theater is a 60-minute television anthology series sponsored by Pond's Creams that was produced by the J. Walter Thompson Agency on ABC-TV. Its original title was Kraft Television Theatre, but when Kraft decided to drop the Thursday night version on the American Broadcasting Company (ABC) Pond's took over the sponsorship and retitled the series Pond's Theater. Twenty-five episodes aired on ABC from January 13, 1955 to July 7, 1955.

The series had its origin in the second simultaneous series of Kraft Television Theatre begun October 1953, on ABC to promote Kraft's new Cheez Whiz product. When the sponsorship came to an end in January 1955, then Pond's picked up the second Kraft Theatre franchise, while the first Kraft Theatre continued to run on NBC-TV. Both series followed the sponsorship format also used by Ford Theatre and Eastman Kodak's Screen Directors Playhouse. The series was produced by J. Walter Thompson at ABC. Directors included Fielder Cook and Roy Boulting.

Reception
Reviewer John Crosby, in a March 31, 1955 article entitled "Pond's Theatre Delivers Satisfying Dramatic Fare" commented that:

Cast
Among its guest stars that year were Sidney Poitier, Joanne Woodward, John Cassavetes, Gena Rowlands, Roddy McDowall, Gene Raymond, Sylvia Sidney, Buster Crabbe, E.G. Marshall, Eva Gabor, Ed Begley, and Mildred Dunnock.

Selected episodes
 Anna Christie

References

External links
Pond's Theater at CVTA with list of episodes

1955 American television series debuts
1955 American television series endings
1950s American anthology television series
1950s American drama television series
American Broadcasting Company original programming
Black-and-white American television shows